William M Ritchie (born 1895) was a Scottish footballer who played for Dumbarton, Bury and Grimsby Town.

His career was brought to an end in 1923  when he was implicated in a match fixing scandal from three years earlier when it was found Bury had accepted payments from Coventry City to prevent the latter's relegation, and Ritchie was banned for life along with several others.

References

1895 births
Scottish footballers
Dumbarton F.C. players
Bury F.C. players
Grimsby Town F.C. players
Scottish Football League players
English Football League players
Year of death missing
Association football outside forwards
Footballers from West Dunbartonshire
People from Renton, West Dunbartonshire